Edna Mayo (born Edna Lane; March 23, 1895 – May 5, 1970) was an American film actress of the silent film era.

Biography
Mayo was born in Philadelphia, Pennsylvania on March 23, 1895, and spent time as a stage actress before moving to Hollywood in 1914 to pursue an acting career. 

That year, she received her first role, in the film Michael Arnold and Doctor Lynn opposite Robert Z. Leonard. In 1914 and 1915, she then starred in twenty-two films, and wrote an article for Picture-Play Weekly in 1915 about the differences between using makeup for stage and film. 

In 1916, she appeared in four films, including The Return of Eve and The Strange Case of Mary Page. During filming for The Return of Eve, the cast and crew were transported to the Midwest, where they shot the film's metropolitan scenes in Chicago and its rural scenes in northern Wisconsin, near the banks of the Dells of the Wisconsin River. She also filmed locations scenes in Milwaukee, Wisconsin with the cast and crew of The Misleading Lady around this same time.  

In 1916's The Strange Case of Mary Page, she wore "$10,000 worth of gowns designed by Lady Duff Gordon (Lucile), the famous modiste."

It then took more than a year before she received another role, playing the female lead in Hearts of Love in 1918. That was her final film; she retired from acting. 

She eventually settled in San Francisco, California, where she was residing at the time of her death on May 5, 1970.

Selected filmography
Aristocracy (1914)
Graustark (1915)
The Misleading Lady (1916)
 The Return of Eve (1916)
 The Strange Case of Mary Page (1916)
 Hearts of Love (1918)

References

External links

American silent film actresses
Actresses from Philadelphia
1895 births
1970 deaths
20th-century American actresses